Henry van der Vegt (born 18 February 1972) is a Dutch retired footballer who played primarily as a midfielder. He played for DOS Kampen, FC Zwolle, Willem II and Udinese.

In June 2019, he was appointed assistant coach to John Stegeman at his former club PEC Zwolle, after having formerly worked as a youth coach and technical director.

References

External links
 CV - Henry van der Vegt

1972 births
Living people
Dutch footballers
Willem II (football club) players
PEC Zwolle players
Udinese Calcio players
Dutch expatriate footballers
Expatriate footballers in Italy
Eredivisie players
Serie A players
People from Kampen, Overijssel
Association football midfielders
PEC Zwolle non-playing staff
Footballers from Overijssel
Dutch expatriate sportspeople in Italy